Riverfront State Prison (RSP) is a former prison in Camden, New Jersey that was operated by the New Jersey Department of Corrections from August 12, 1985, to 2009. It was located in the neighborhood of Cooper Point at the intersection of Delaware Avenue and Elm Street.

The prison first opened after the state paid Camden money in exchange for receiving a plot of land that was used to establish the prison.

In 2007, while the state was preparing to close Riverfront, it considered establishing a replacement state prison in Cumberland County, which already had three other state prisons. When officials from the city of Bridgeton, New Jersey heard of a state report proposing to move Riverfront's prisoners to South Woods State Prison in Bridgeton, Bridgeton officials opposed the plans.

Riverfront closed in 2009. The state had a savings of $43 million per year. The 16-acre site is considered surplus property by the state the buildings were demolished in 2009.

In May 2013 the New Jersey Economic Development Authority announced that it would seek developers for the site. The project would be built in four phases, the first of which would be a promenade along the Delaware River.

References

External links

 Riverfront State Prison – New Jersey Department of Corrections

Buildings and structures in Camden, New Jersey
Defunct prisons in New Jersey
1985 establishments in New Jersey
2009 disestablishments in New Jersey
Buildings and structures demolished in 2010